Comitatus is the Latin term for an armed escort or retinue.

Comitatus may also refer to:
 Comitatus (First Bulgarian State), areas in the First Bulgarian Empire
 Comitatus (Kingdom of Hungary), counties in the Kingdom of Hungary
 Comitatenses, armies of the late Roman Empire
 Posse comitatus (disambiguation), various meanings
 Comitatus: A Journal of Medieval and Renaissance Studies, published by the UCLA Center for Medieval and Renaissance Studies

See also
 
 Comes, Latin epithet for a companion or hero
 County, a geographical region of a country
 Retinue, a body of persons "retained" in the service of a noble or royal person